Katharine Meyer Graham (June 16, 1917 – July 17, 2001) was an American newspaper publisher. She led her family's newspaper, The Washington Post, from 1963 to 1991. Graham presided over the paper as it reported on the Watergate scandal, which eventually led to the resignation of President Richard Nixon. She was the first 20th century female publisher of a major American newspaper and the first woman elected to the board of the Associated Press.

Graham's memoir, Personal History, won the Pulitzer Prize in 1998.

Early life

Katharine Meyer was born in 1917 into a wealthy family in New York City, to Agnes Elizabeth (née Ernst) and Eugene Meyer. Her father was a financier and, later, Chairman of the Federal Reserve. Her grandfather was Marc Eugene Meyer, and her great-grandfather was rabbi Joseph Newmark. Her father bought The Washington Post in 1933 at a bankruptcy auction. Her mother was a bohemian intellectual, art lover, and political activist in the Republican Party, who shared friendships with people as diverse as Auguste Rodin, Marie Curie, Thomas Mann, Albert Einstein, Eleanor Roosevelt, John Dewey and Saul Alinsky.

Her father was of Alsatian Jewish descent, and her mother was a Lutheran whose parents were German immigrants. Along with her four siblings, Katharine was baptized as a Lutheran but attended an Episcopal church. Her siblings included Florence, Eugene III (Bill), Ruth and Elizabeth Meyer.

Meyer's parents owned several homes across the country, but primarily lived between a "castle" on a large estate near Mount Kisco, New York, and a mansion in Washington, D.C. Meyer often did not see much of her parents during her childhood, as both traveled and socialized extensively; she was raised in part by nannies, governesses and tutors. Katharine endured a strained relationship with her mother. Agnes was reportedly very negative and condescending towards Katharine, which had a negative impact on Meyer's self-confidence.

Her older sister Florence Meyer was a successful photographer and wife of actor Oscar Homolka. Her father's sister, Florence Meyer Blumenthal, founded the Prix Blumenthal.

Meyer was an alumna of The Madeira School (to which her father had donated much land) and attended Vassar College before transferring to the University of Chicago. In Chicago, she became quite interested in labor issues and shared friendships with people from walks of life very different from her own.

Career
After graduation, Meyer worked for a short period at a San Francisco newspaper where, among other things, she helped cover a major strike by wharf workers. Meyer began working for the Post in 1938. While in Washington, D.C., she met a former schoolmate, Will Lang Jr. The two dated, but broke off the relationship due to conflicting interests.

On June 5, 1940, Meyer was married in a Lutheran ceremony, to Philip Graham, a graduate of Harvard Law School and a clerk for Supreme Court Justice Felix Frankfurter. They had a daughter, Lally Morris Weymouth (born 1943), and three sons: Donald Edward Graham (born 1945), William Welsh Graham (1948-2017) and Stephen Meyer Graham (born 1952). She was affiliated as a Lutheran.

William Graham died at 69 on December 20, 2017, in his Los Angeles home. Like his father, Phil Graham, he died by suicide.

The Washington Post

Philip Graham became publisher of the Post in 1946, when Eugene Meyer handed over the newspaper to his son-in-law. Katharine recounts in her autobiography, Personal History, how she did not feel slighted by the fact her father gave the Post to Philip rather than her: "Far from troubling me that my father thought of my husband and not me, it pleased me. In fact, it never crossed my mind that he might have viewed me as someone to take on an important job at the paper."  Her father, Eugene Meyer, went on to become the head of the World Bank, but left that position only six months later. He was Chairman of the Washington Post Company until his death in 1959, when Philip Graham took that position and the company expanded with the purchases of television stations and Newsweek magazine.

Social life and politics
The Grahams were important members of the Washington social scene, becoming friends with John F. Kennedy and Jacqueline Kennedy Onassis, Robert F. Kennedy, Lyndon B. Johnson, Robert McNamara, Henry Kissinger, Ronald Reagan, and Nancy Reagan among many others.

In her 1997 autobiography, Graham comments several times about how close her husband was to politicians of his day (he was instrumental, for example, in getting Johnson to be the Democratic vice presidential nominee in 1960), and how such personal closeness with politicians later became unacceptable in journalism. She tried to push lawyer Edward Bennett Williams into the role of Washington D.C.'s first commissioner mayor in 1967. The position went to Howard University-educated lawyer Walter Washington.

Graham was also known for a long-time friendship with Warren Buffett, whose Berkshire Hathaway owned a substantial stake in the Post.

Philip Graham's illness and death
Philip Graham dealt with alcoholism and mental illness throughout his marriage to Katharine. He had mood swings and often belittled her. On Christmas Eve in 1962, Katharine learned her husband was having an affair with Robin Webb, an Australian stringer for Newsweek. Philip declared that he would divorce Katharine for Robin, and he made motions to divide the couple's assets.

At a newspaper conference in Phoenix, Arizona, Philip apparently had a nervous breakdown. He was sedated, flown back to Washington, and placed in the Chestnut Lodge psychiatric facility in nearby Rockville. On August 3, 1963, he committed suicide with a shotgun at the couple's "Glen Welby" estate near Marshall in the Virginia horse country.

Leadership of the Post

Katharine Graham assumed the reins of the company and of the Post after Philip Graham's suicide. She held the title of president and was de facto publisher of the paper from September 1963. She formally held the title of publisher from 1969 to 1979, and that of chairwoman of the board from 1973 to 1991. She became the first female Fortune 500 CEO in 1972, as CEO of the Washington Post company. As the only woman to be in such a high position at a publishing company, she had no female role models and had difficulty being taken seriously by many of her male colleagues and employees. Graham outlined in her memoir her lack of confidence and distrust in her own knowledge. The convergence of the women's movement with Graham's control of the Post brought about changes in Graham's attitude and also led her to promote gender equality within her company.

Graham hired Benjamin Bradlee as editor, and cultivated Warren Buffett for his financial advice; he became a major shareholder and something of an eminence grise in the company. Her son Donald was publisher from 1979 until 2000.

Watergate
Graham presided over the Post at a crucial time in its history. The Post played an integral role in unveiling the Watergate conspiracy which ultimately led to the resignation of President Richard Nixon.

Graham and editor Bradlee first experienced challenges when they published the content of the Pentagon Papers. When Post reporters Bob Woodward and Carl Bernstein brought the Watergate story to Bradlee, Graham supported their investigative reporting and Bradlee ran stories about Watergate when few other news outlets were reporting on the matter.

In conjunction with the Watergate scandal, Graham was the subject of one of the best-known threats in American journalistic history. It occurred in 1972, when Nixon's attorney general, John Mitchell, warned reporter Carl Bernstein about a forthcoming article: "Katie Graham's gonna get her tit caught in a big fat wringer if that's published." The Post published the quote, although Bradlee cut the words her tit. Graham later observed that it was "especially strange of [Mitchell] to call me Katie, which no one has ever called me."

Views regarding the relationship between the press and intelligence agencies 
On November 16, 1988, Graham gave a speech titled "Secrecy and the Press" to a packed auditorium at CIA headquarters as part of that agency's Office of Training and Education's Guest Speaker series. In discussing the potential for press disclosures to affect national security, Graham said: "We live in a dirty and dangerous world. There are some things the general public does not need to know, and shouldn't. I believe democracy flourishes when the government can take legitimate steps to keep its secrets and when the press can decide whether to print what it knows."

Other accomplishments and recognition

Graham had strong links to the Rockefeller family, serving both as a member of the Rockefeller University council and as a close friend of the Museum of Modern Art, where she was honored as a recipient of the David Rockefeller Award for enlightened generosity and advocacy of cultural and civic endeavors.

At the University of Chicago, Katherine Graham has a dormhouse in Max Palevsky Residential Commons named after her. Every year on March 2 they celebrate "Graham Day," honoring their namesake and her accomplishments.

In 1966, Graham was the named honoree of Truman Capote's Black and White Ball.

In 1973, Graham received the Elijah Parish Lovejoy Award as well as an honorary Doctor of Laws degree from Colby College.

In 1974, Graham became the first woman elected to the board of directors at the Associated Press.

In 1975, Graham received the S. Roger Horchow Award for Greatest Public Service by a Private Citizen, an award given out annually by Jefferson Awards.

In 1979, the Supersisters trading card set was produced and distributed; one of the cards featured Graham's name and picture.

In 1979, Deborah Davis published a book titled Katharine the Great about Graham.

In 1987, Graham won the Walter Cronkite Award for Excellence in Journalism.

In 1988, Graham was elected a Fellow of the American Academy of Arts and Sciences.

Graham published her memoirs, Personal History, in 1997. The book was praised for its honest portrayal of Philip Graham's mental illness and received rave reviews for her depiction of her life, as well as a glimpse into how the roles of women have changed over the course of Graham's life. The book won the Pulitzer Prize in 1998.

Nora Ephron of the New York Times, who was at one point married to Carl Bernstein, raved about Graham's autobiography. She found it an amazing story of how Graham was able to succeed in a male-dominated industry.
“Am I making clear how extraordinary this book is? “ Ephron said. “She manages to rewrite the story of her life in such a way that no one will ever be able to boil it down to a sentence.”

In 1997, she received the Freedom medal.

In 1999, Graham received the Golden Plate Award of the American Academy of Achievement. The award was presented by Awards Council member Coretta Scott King.

In 2000, Graham was named one of the International Press Institute's 50 World Press Freedom Heroes of the past 50 years.

In 2002, Graham was presented, posthumously, with the Presidential Medal of Freedom by President George W. Bush.

In 2002, Graham was inducted into the National Women's Hall of Fame.

On January 30, 1998, television station WCPX-TV in Orlando changed its callsign to WKMG-TV in honor of longtime Washington Post publisher, Katharine M. Graham.

In 2017, Graham was portrayed by Meryl Streep in the Steven Spielberg film The Post. Streep was nominated for an Academy Award for Best Actress (among other awards) for her work. Graham does not appear in the film adaptation of All The President's Men, but Robert Redford, who plays Woodward, revealed that Graham had a scene written for her in earlier versions where she asks Woodward and Bernstein (played by Dustin Hoffman) about the Watergate story, beginning with, "What are you doing with my paper?"

Death
 
On July 14, 2001, Graham fell and struck her head while visiting Sun Valley, Idaho; she died three days later at the age of 84. Her funeral took place at the Washington National Cathedral. Graham is buried in historic Oak Hill Cemetery, across the street from her former home in Georgetown.

Notes

References

External links

Charlie Rose's interview with Katharine Graham, year-1997 

1917 births
2001 deaths
20th-century American newspaper publishers (people)
20th-century American women writers
Accidental deaths from falls
Accidental deaths in Idaho
American people of German descent
American people of German-Jewish descent
American women memoirists
20th-century American memoirists
Burials at Oak Hill Cemetery (Washington, D.C.)
Businesspeople from Washington, D.C.
Elijah Parish Lovejoy Award recipients
Fellows of the American Academy of Arts and Sciences
Graham family (newspapers)
Journalists from Washington, D.C.
Madeira School alumni
People from Georgetown (Washington, D.C.)
People from Mount Kisco, New York
Presidential Medal of Freedom recipients
Pulitzer Prize for Biography or Autobiography winners
Recipients of the Four Freedoms Award
University of Chicago alumni
Vassar College alumni
The Washington Post publishers
Watergate scandal investigators